Ironton is an unincorporated community and census-designated place (CDP) in Charlevoix County in the U.S. state of Michigan. The population of the CDP was 148 at the 2020 census.  It is located within Eveline Township on a narrow portion of Lake Charlevoix that is traversed by the Ironton Ferry.

History
In 1879, Robert Cherry settled here along the shores of Pine Lake (now known as Lake Charlevoix).  Cherry worked for the Pine Lake Iron Company of Chicago and built a plant here that opened in 1881.  The plant used iron ore brought in by barges from the Upper Peninsula and turned it into pig iron.  A post office opened in Ironton on January 31, 1881, and the community was platted in 1884.  The iron operation ultimately failed in 1893, but the community remained.  The post office closed on December 30, 1965.

The community of Ironton was listed as a newly-organized census-designated place for the 2010 census, meaning it now has officially defined boundaries and population statistics for the first time.

Geography

Ironton is located in the western segment of Eveline Township, which is divided by Lake Charlevoix.  The Ironton Ferry within the community connects the two segments of the township along a narrow stretch of the lake.

Major highways
  runs south–north through the community.

Demographics

Education
Ironton is served primarily by Charlevoix Public Schools to the northwest in Charlevoix, while some southwestern portions of the community may be served by East Jordan Public Schools farther to the south in East Jordan.

References

Unincorporated communities in Charlevoix County, Michigan
Unincorporated communities in Michigan
Census-designated places in Charlevoix County, Michigan
Census-designated places in Michigan
Populated places established in 1879
1879 establishments in Michigan